JE Design GmbH (stylized JE DESIGN) is a German car tuning manufacturer.  They specialise in the four primary brands of Volkswagen Group, namely Volkswagen, Audi, SEAT, and Škoda cars.

JE DESIGN was founded by Jochen Eckelt in 1990.  They are based in the Leingarten municipality in the district of Heilbronn, Baden-Württemberg, Germany.

References

External links
 Official Homepage

Auto parts suppliers of Germany
Automotive companies established in 1990
Automotive motorsports and performance companies
Auto tuning companies
1990 establishments in Germany